The year 1992 was the 211th year of the Rattanakosin Kingdom of Thailand. It was the 47th year of the reign of King Bhumibol Adulyadej (Rama IX), and is reckoned as the year 2535 in the Buddhist Era. It is most significantly the year which saw the events of Black May, a pivotal moment in Thailand's political history.

Incumbents
King: Bhumibol Adulyadej
Crown Prince: Vajiralongkorn
Prime Minister: 
 until 23 March: Anand Panyarachun
 7 April-24 May: Suchinda Kraprayoon
 24 May-10 June: Meechai Ruchuphan (acting)
 10 June-22 September: Anand Panyarachun
 starting 20 September: Chuan Leekpai
Supreme Patriarch: Nyanasamvara Suvaddhana

Events

See also
 Miss Universe 1992

References

 
Years of the 20th century in Thailand
Thailand